Selim III (24 December 1761 – 28 July 1808) was the Sultan of the Ottoman Empire from 1789 to 1807. Regarded as an enlightened ruler, the Janissaries eventually deposed and imprisoned him, and placed his cousin Mustafa on the throne as Mustafa IV. Selim was subsequently killed by a group of assassins.

Early life 

Selim III was the son of Sultan Mustafa III and his wife Mihrişah Sultan. His mother Mihrişah Sultan originated in Georgia, and when she became the Valide sultan, she participated in reforming the government schools and establishing political corporations. His father Ottoman Sultan Mustafa III was very well educated and believed in the necessity of reforms. Mustafa III attempted to create a powerful army during the peacetime with professional, well-educated soldiers. This was primarily motivated by his fear of a Russian invasion. During the Russo-Turkish War, he fell ill and died of a heart attack in 1774. Sultan Mustafa was aware of the fact that a military reform was necessary. He declared new military regulations and opened maritime and artillery academies.

Sultan Mustafa was very influenced by mysticism. An oracle predicted his son Selim would be a world conqueror, so he organized a joyous feast lasting seven days. Selim was very well educated in the palace. Sultan Mustafa III named his son as his successor; however, Selim's uncle Abdul Hamid I ascended the throne after Mustafa's death. Sultan Abdul Hamid I took care of Selim and put great emphasis on his education.

After Abdul Hamid's death, Selim succeeded him on 7 April 1789, at the age of 27. Sultan Selim III was very fond of literature and calligraphy; many of his works were put on the walls of mosques and convents. He wrote many poems, especially about Crimea's occupation by Russia. He spoke Arabic, Persian, Turkish and Old Bulgarian fluently. Selim III showed great importance to patriotism and religion.  He demonstrated his skills in poetry, music and was fond of fine arts and the army.

Reign

Plans of reforms 

The talents and energy with which Selim III was endowed had endeared him to the people, and great hopes were founded on his accession. He had associated much with foreigners, and was thoroughly persuaded of the necessity of reforming his state.

However, Austria and Russia gave him no time for anything but defense, and it was not until the Peace of Iaşi (1792) that a breathing space was allowed him in Europe, while Napoleon's invasion of Egypt and Syria soon called for the empire's strongest efforts.

Ottoman provinces from Egypt to Syria began to implement French policies and began to differ away from Istanbul after Napoleon's attack.

Selim III profited by the respite to abolish the military tenure of fiefs; he introduced salutary reforms into the administration, especially in the fiscal department, sought by well-considered plans to extend the spread of education, and engaged foreign officers as instructors, by whom a small corps of new troops called nizam-i-jedid were collected and drilled in 1797. This unit was composed of Turkish peasant youths from Anatolia and supplied with modern weaponry.

These troops were able to hold their own against rebellious Janissaries in the Balkan provinces such as the Sanjak of Smederevo against its appointed Vizier Hadži Mustafa Pasha, where disaffected governors made no scruple of attempting to make use of them against the reforming sultan.

Emboldened by this success, Selim III issued an order that in future picked men should be taken annually from the Janissaries to serve in the nizam-i-jedid. Selim III was unable to integrate the nizam-i jedid with the rest of the army which overall limited its role in the defense of the state.

Foreign relations 

Selim III ascended the throne only to find that the Ottoman Empire of old had been considerably reduced due to conflicts outside the realm. From the north Russia had taken the Black Sea through the Treaty of Küçük Kaynarca in 1774. Selim realized the importance of diplomatic relations with other nations, and pushed for permanent embassies in the courts of all the great nations of Europe, a hard task because of religious prejudice towards Muslims. Even with the religious obstacles, resident embassies were established in Britain, France, Prussia and Austria. Selim, a cultured poet and musician, carried on an extended correspondence with Louis XVI. Although distressed by the establishment of the republic in France, Ottoman government was soothed by French representatives in Constantinople who maintained the goodwill of various influential personages.

On 1 July 1798, however, French forces landed in Egypt, and Selim declared war on France. In alliance with Russia and Britain, the Turks were in periodic conflict with the French on both land and sea until March 1801. Peace came in June 1802, The following year brought trouble in the Balkans. For decades a sultan's word had had no power in outlying provinces, prompting Selim's reforms of the military in order to reimpose central control. This desire was not fulfilled. One rebellious leader was Austrian-backed Osman Pazvantoğlu, whose invasion of Wallachia in 1801 inspired Russian intervention, resulting in greater autonomy for the Dunubian provinces. Serbian conditions also deteriorated. They took a fateful turn with the return of the hated Janissaries, ousted 8 years before. These forces murdered Selim's enlightened governor, ending the best rule this province had had in the last 100 years.  Neither arms nor diplomacy could restore Ottoman authority.

French influence with the Sublime Porte (the European diplomatic designation of the Ottoman state) did not revive but it then led the Sultan into defying both St. Petersburg and London, and Turkey joined Napoleon's Continental System. War was declared on Russia on 27 December and on Britain in March 1807.

Janissary revolt 
The Sultan's most ambitious military project was the creation of an entirely new infantry corps fully trained and equipped according to the latest European standards. This unit, called the nizam-i jedid (the new order), was formed in 1797 and adopted a pattern of recruitment that was uncommon for the imperial forces; it was composed of Turkish peasant youths from Anatolia, a clear indication that the devshirme system was no longer functional. Officered and trained by Europeans, the nizam-i jedid was outfitted with modern weapons and French-style uniforms. By 1806 the new army numbered around 23,000 troops, including a modern artillery corps, and its units performed effectively in minor actions. But Selim III's inability to integrate the force with the regular army and his reluctance to deploy it against his domestic opponents limited its role in defending the state it was created to preserve.

From the start of Selim's reign, the Janissaries had viewed this entire program of military reform as a threat to their independence, and they refused to serve alongside the new army in the field. The powerful derebeys were alarmed by the way in which the sultan financed his new forces—he confiscated timars and directed the other revenue toward the nizam-i jedid. Further opposition came from the ulama and other members of the ruling elite who objected to the European models on which Selim based his military reforms.

Led by the rebellious Janissaries, these forces came together in 1806, deposed Selim III, and selected a successor, Mustafa IV, who pledged not to interfere with their privileges. The decree of deposition accused Selim III of failing to respect the religion of Islam and the tradition of the Ottomans. Over the course of the next year, the embassies in Europe were dismantled, the nizam-i jedid troops were dispersed, and the deposed sultan, whose cautious military reforms were intended to do no more than preserve the tradition of the Ottomans, was murdered.

Austro-Turkish War (1787–1791)

The Austro-Turkish War of 1787 was an inconclusive struggle between the Austrian and Ottoman Empires. It took place concomitantly with the Russo-Turkish War of 1787-1792 during the reign of the Ottoman Sultan Selim III.

Russo-Turkish war 

The first major Russo-Turkish War (1768–1774) began after Turkey demanded that Russia’s ruler, Catherine II the Great, abstain from interfering in Poland’s internal affairs. The Russians went on to win impressive victories over the Turks. They captured Azov, the Crimea, and Bessarabia, and under Field Marshal Pyotr Rumyantsev they overran Moldavia and also defeated the Turks in Bulgaria. The Turks were compelled to seek peace, which was concluded in the Treaty of Küçük Kaynarca. This treaty made the Crimean khanate independent of the Turkish sultan advanced the Russian frontier. Russia was now in a much stronger position to expand, and in 1783 Catherine annexed the Crimean Peninsula outright.

War broke out in 1787, with Austria again on the side of Russia. Under General Alexander Suvorov, the Russians won several victories that gave them control of the lower Dniester and Danube rivers, and further Russian successes compelled the Turks to sign the Treaty of Jassy on 9 January 1792. By this treaty Turkey ceded the entire western Ukrainian Black Sea coast to Russia. When Turkey deposed the Russophile governors of Moldavia and Walachia in 1806, war broke out again, though in a desultory fashion, since Russia was reluctant to concentrate large forces against Turkey while its relations with Napoleonic France were so uncertain. But in 1811, with the prospect of a war between France and Russia in sight, the latter sought a quick decision on its southern frontier. The Russian field marshal Mikhail Kutuzov’s victorious campaign of 1811–12 forced the Turks to sign the Treaty of Bucharest on 18 May 1812. Ending the war that had begun in 1806, this peace agreement established the Ottoman cession of Bessarabia to Russia.

The Russians also secured amnesty and a promise of autonomy for the Serbs, who had been rebelling against Turkish rule, but Turkish garrisons were given control of the Serbian fortresses. Implementation of the treaty was forestalled by a number of disputes, and Turkish troops invaded Serbia again the following year.

Relations with Tipu Sultan

Tipu Sultan was an independent ruler of the Sultanate of Mysore, with high regards of loyalty to the Mughal Emperor Shah Alam II. He had urgently requested Ottoman assistance during the Third Anglo-Mysore War, in which he had suffered an irreversible defeat. Tipu Sultan then began to consolidate his relations with France. In an attempt to support and open a route to link up with Tipu Sultan, Napoleon invaded Ottoman Egypt in the year 1798, causing a furor in Constantinople.

The British then appealed to Selim III to send a letter to Tipu Sultan requesting the Sultanate of Mysore to halt its state of war against the British East India Company. Selim III then wrote a letter to Tipu Sultan criticizing the French, and also informed Tipu Sultan that the Ottomans would act as intermediary between the Sultanate of Mysore and the British. Tipu Sultan wrote twice to Selim III, rejecting the advice of the Ottomans, unfortunately before most of his letters could arrive in Constantinople, the Fourth Anglo-Mysore War broke out and Tipu Sultan was killed during the Siege of Seringapatam (1799).

Alcohol prohibition

Many of the Ottoman sultans imposed alcohol bans (often with limited success). Despite Selim III's hardline stance on alcohol consumption, and threats to execute Christians and Jews caught selling wine or rakı to Muslims, it proved extremely difficult to curtail alcohol consumption in Istanbul, where wines were locally produced and the city had many established wine-houses serving its non-Muslim residents.

1806 Edirne Incident 
The 1806 Edirne Incident was an armed confrontation between the New Order Troops (Nizam-I Cedid) of Ottoman Sultan Selim III and a coalition of Balkan magnates, the ayans, and the region's Janissary garrisons that occurred in Thrace throughout the summer of 1806. The cause of the incident was Selim III's attempt to expand the New Order's permanent presence into Rumelia through the establishment of New Order barracks in the region's cities. The ultimate outcome of the confrontation was the retreat of imperial forces to Istanbul and to Anatolia, which constituted a deathblow to Selim III's ambitions of expanding his reformed army, as well as a major blow to his legitimacy.  This deteriorated image would result in his deposition the following May.

Downfall and assassination 

Selim III was, however, thoroughly under the influence of French ambassador to the Porte Horace Sébastiani, and the fleet was compelled to retire without effecting its purpose. But the anarchy, manifest or latent, existing throughout the provinces proved too great for Selim III to cope with. The Janissaries rose once more in revolt, induced the Sheikh ul-Islam to grant a fetva against the reforms, dethroned and imprisoned Selim III, and placed his cousin Mustafa on the throne, as Mustafa IV (1807–08), on 29 May 1807.

The ayan of Rustchuk, Alemdar Mustafa, a strong partisan of the reforms, collected an army of 40,000 men and marched on Constantinople with the purpose of reinstating Selim III, but he came too late. The ill-fated reforming Sultan had been stabbed in the seraglio by the Chief Black Eunuch and his men. Upon his arrival in the capital, Bairakdar's only resource was to wreak his vengeance on Mustafa IV and to place on the throne Mahmud II (1808–1839), the sole surviving member of the house of Osman.

Another version about his murder states that at the time of his deposition, Selim was staying at the Harem. The night of Thursday, 28 July 1808, he was with two of his consorts, Refet Kadın and Pakize Hanım. Alemdar Mustafa Pasha, a loyalist of Selim, was approaching the city with his army to reinstate Selim. Therefore, Mustafa IV gave orders to murder him and his brother Prince Mahmud.

The assassins were apparently a group of men, including the Master of the Wardrobe called Fettah the Georgian, the Treasury steward Ebe Selim, and black eunuch named Nezir Ağa. Selim apparently knew his end was coming when he saw their swords drawn. Pakize Hanım threw herself between them and her lord, she was cut in her hand. Refet Kadın started screaming in terror, another slave girl who rushed in fainted when she saw what was about to happen. A struggle ensued and the former sultan was cut down and murdered, his last words apparently being "Allahu Akbar" ("God is great").

Refet Kadın threw herself on the body but was dragged away. The body was quickly wrapped in a quilt. The assassins moved on to find Prince Mahmud and attempt to murder him too. He was more fortunate though and later ordered the assassins to be executed. Selim III would be the only Ottoman sultan to be killed by the sword. He was buried in Laleli Mosque near his father's tomb.

Interest in poetry and arts 

A great lover of music, Sultan Selim III was a composer and performer of significant talent. He created fourteen makam-s (melodic types), three of which are in current use today. Sixty-four compositions by Selim III are known today, some of which are part of the regular repertory of Turkish classical music performerance. Aside from composing music, Selim III also performed on the ney (reed flute) and tanbur (long-necked, fretted lute).

Selim III's interest in music started in his days as a prince (shahzade) when he studied under Kırımlı Ahmet Kamil Efendi and Tanburi İzak Efendi. He was especially respectful of Tanburi İzak Efendi, and it is recounted that the Sultan rose in respect when Tanburi İzak Efendi entered the court.

As a patron of the arts, Selim III encouraged musicians of his day, including Dede Efendi and Baba Hamparsum. The Hamparsum notation system that Selim commissioned became the dominant notation for Turkish and Armenian music. His name is associated with a school in Classical Turkish Music due to the revival and rebirth of music at his court. Selim III was also interested in western music and in 1797 invited an opera troupe for the first opera performance in the Ottoman Empire.

Writing under the nom de plume ″İlhami″, Selim's poetry is collected in a divan. Among regular attendees of his court were Şeyh Galib, considered one of the four greatest Ottoman poets. Galib is now considered to have been not only an intimate friend of the Sultan, as they were both quite close in age, but through Galib's poetry you find an overwhelming support for his new military reforms

Selim III was a member of the Mevlevi Order of Sufi Whirling Dervishes, and entered into the order at the Galata Mevlevihanesi under the name ″Selim Dede". He was a renowned composer, creating many musical compositions, including a Mevlevi ayin, a long and complex liturgical form performed during the semâ (religious ceremonies) of the Mevlana (Jalal ad-Din Muhammad Balkhi-Rumi) Tariqah of Sufi Whirling Mystics, in makam Suzidilara.

He extended his patronage to Antoine Ignace Melling, whom he appointed as the court architect in 1795. Melling constructed a number of palaces and other buildings for the Sultan and created engravings of contemporary Constantinople.

Family 
Selim III had numerous consorts, but no children.

Consorts 
Selim III had at least thirteen consorts: 
 Nefizar Kadın. BaşKadin (first consort). Also called Nafizar, Safizar or Sefizar. She died on 30 May 1792 and was buried in the Laleli Mosque. 
 Afitab Kadın. She became BaşKadin after Nefizar's death. She died in 1807. 
 Zibifer Kadın. Also called Ziybülfer. After Selim's assassination, she lived in a palace on the Bosphorus. She died 10 March 1817 and was buried in the Büyük Selimiye in Üsküdar. 
 Tabisefa Kadın. After the assassination of Selim III he lived in the Fındıklı Palace. She died on 14 March 1855 and was buried in the Laleli mosque. 
 Refet Kadın. She was born in 1777. She was one of two concubine who tried to prevent Selim's murder. Refet threw herself on the sultan to protect him, but was thrown away and had to watch the killers finish the job while her screamed and cried and tearing her hair. She died on 22 October 1867 and was buried in the Mihrişah Sultan mausoleum in Eyüp. 
 Nüruşems Kadın. She died in May 1826 and was buried in the Laleli mosque. 
 Hüsnümah Kadın. Received the income of Tire. She died in 1814 and was buried in the Laleli mosque. 
 Demhoş Kadın. She became one of the consorts in 1799. She probably died around 1806. 
 Goncenigar Kadın. She died after 1806. 
 Mahbube Kadın. She died after 1806. 
 Aynısefa Kadın. She died after 1794. 
 Pakize Hanım. BaşIkbal, she was one of the major favorites. She was one of the two consorts who tried to prevent Selim's murder. Pakize threw herself between the assassins and the sultan and was wounded in the hand in the struggle. 
 Meryem Hanim. She died after 22 August 1807.

See also
 Ottoman military reform efforts
 Nizam-i Jedid
 Kabakçı Mustafa
 Kuguzade Suleyman Pasha

Ancestry

Notes

Bibliography
Basaran, Betul. Selim III, Social Control and Policing in Istanbul at the End of the Eighteenth Century: Between Crisis and Order (Leiden: Brill, 2014)
 Sakul, Kahraman. "Innovation and Empire in Turkey: Sultan Selim III and the Modernisation of the Ottoman Navy." International Journal of Turkish Studies 19.1/2 (2013): 158.
 
 Shaw, Stanford J. Between old and new: the Ottoman Empire under Sultan Selim III, 1789-1807 (Harvard University Press, 1971) online review 
 Shaw, Stanford J. "The origins of Ottoman military reform: the Nizam-i Cedid army of Sultan Selim III." Journal of Modern History 37.3 (1965): 291-306. online
 Tuncay Zorlu, Sultan Selim III and the Modernisation of the Ottoman Navy (London, I.B. Tauris, 2011).
 Yassin, Qasim, and Hamid Hajianpour. "The New Order of Sultan Selim III: The Turning Point of the Ottoman Empire's Tendency towards Modern Reforms (1789-1807)." The History of Islamic Culture and Civilization A Quarterly Research Journal 10.37 (2020): 87-98.

References

External links

1761 births
1808 deaths
18th-century Ottoman sultans
19th-century Ottoman sultans
Assassinated caliphs
19th-century murdered monarchs
Turkish classical composers
Turkish musicians
Executed people from the Ottoman Empire
19th-century executions by the Ottoman Empire
Composers of Ottoman classical music
Composers of Turkish makam music
Turks from the Ottoman Empire
Assassinated royalty
The Sultan of Two Lands and the Khan of Two Seas
Dethroned monarchs
1808 murders in Asia